Khalid Abdul Mumin Suleman (born 6 June 1998), commonly known as Abdul Mumin, is a Ghanaian professional footballer who plays as a centre-back for La Liga club Rayo Vallecano.

Club career

Youth
Mumin was born in Accra and was a part of the academy at Right to Dream. The defender was an integral part of the RtD U18's team, helping them win back to back Gothia Cup tournaments in 2014 and in 2015.

FC Nordsjælland
On 2 August 2016, it was confirmed, that Mumin had signed a professional contract with Danish Superliga side FC Nordsjælland, and joined their U19 squad.

Mumin made his Nordsjælland debut on 7 August 2016, just a few days after signing with the club. Mumin started on the bench, but replaced Viktor Tranberg in the 62nd minute in a 2–1 defeat against AaB in the Danish Superliga.

He was promoted to the first team squad for the 2017–18 season. After Nordsjælland sold Andreas Skovgaard in January 2019, Mumin began to play continuously.

Loan to HB Køge
On 23 January 2018, Mumin was loaned out to Danish 1st Division club HB Køge for the rest of the season.

Vitória de Guimarães
On 15 August 2020, Portuguese Primeira Liga club Vitória S.C. signed Mumin on a four-year deal. Mumin got shirt number 6 and made his official debut for the club in the Primeira Liga on 18 September 2020 against Belenenses SAD, playing all 90 minutes.

Rayo Vallecano
On 1 September 2022, Mumin signed a four-year contract with La Liga side Rayo Vallecano. Mumin got his debut for the Spanish side on 17 September 2022 against Athletic Bilbao.

International career
At the end of December 2021, Mumin received his first call-up to the Ghana national team, being summoned to the squad for the 2021 Africa Cup of Nations in January 2022.

References

External links
 
 
 

1998 births
Living people
Association football central defenders
Ghanaian footballers
FC Nordsjælland players
HB Køge players
Vitória S.C. players
Rayo Vallecano players
Primeira Liga players
Danish Superliga players
Danish 1st Division players
La Liga players
Ghanaian expatriate footballers
Ghanaian expatriate sportspeople in Denmark
Ghanaian expatriate sportspeople in Portugal
Ghanaian expatriate sportspeople in Spain
Expatriate men's footballers in Denmark
Expatriate footballers in Portugal
Expatriate footballers in Spain